Riou is a common family name from Brittany, in France:

Riou may refer to:

People
 Edward Riou (1762–1801), British naval officer
 Édouard Riou (1833–1900), Breton French painter
 Jakez Riou (1899–1937), Breton French writer
 André Riou (1918–2005), French footballer (soccer player)
 Bernadette Perrin-Riou (b. 1955), French number theorist
 Jean-Pierre Riou (b. 1963), Breton French musician and songwriter, leader of Red Cardell
 Vincent Riou (b. 1972), French sailor
 Rudy Riou (b. 1980), French footballer (soccer player)
 Marie Riou (b. 1981), French sailor
 Rémy Riou (b. 1987), French footballer (soccer player)
 Panuga Riou (b. 1992), English badminton player
 Alan Riou (b. 1997), French cyclist
 Matthis Riou (b. 2001), French footballer (soccer player)

Places
 several small rivers in France
 Île de Riou, an island near Marseille, France

Ships
, a British frigate in commission in the Royal Navy from 1943 to 1945

Other
 Riou (Suikoden), the name given to the protagonist in the Japanese novelization and radio drama adaptation of the video game Suikoden II
 Short spelling of 2022 Russian invasion of Ukraine.

Surnames of Breton origin
Breton-language surnames